Leonid Viktorovich Pavlovski (born 29 May 1949) is a retired Russian field hockey defender. He was the captain of the Soviet team that who the bronze medal at the 1980 Olympics in Moscow.

As most Soviet field hockey players of the 1970s Pavlovski competed both in bandy and field hockey, and won Soviet championships in both sports: in bandy in 1971 and 1974 and in field hockey in 1980. After retiring from competitions around 1983 he became the head coach of the Soviet and then Russian field hockey teams. Being a lifelong member of  he was a career military officer holding the rank of lieutenant colonel.

References

External links
 

1949 births
Living people
People from Krasnoturyinsk
Russian male field hockey players
Olympic field hockey players of the Soviet Union
Soviet male field hockey players
Field hockey players at the 1980 Summer Olympics
Olympic bronze medalists for the Soviet Union
Olympic medalists in field hockey
Medalists at the 1980 Summer Olympics
Sportspeople from Sverdlovsk Oblast